Andriy Fedetskyi (5 August 1958 – 23 August 2018) was a Ukrainian professional football player who played as defender and midfielder and manager.

Playing and coaching career
Fedetskyi was a product of the two youth sportive schools in Lviv, but made his professional career mainly in the Volyn Lutsk and become it the best goalscorer (alongside with a teammate Volodymyr Dykyi) with 91 goals.

After his retirement Fedetskyi twice was an assistant coach to Volyn Lutsk.

Personal life
His son Artem Fedetskyi is also a former professional football player.

Death
Fedetskyi died on 23 August 2018 at the age of 60.

Honours
Soviet Cup finalist (1) with FC Metalist Kharkiv: 1983
 Master of Sport of the USSR (1983)

References

External links

 

1958 births
2018 deaths
Soviet footballers
Ukrainian footballers
Ukrainian football managers
Soviet expatriate footballers
Expatriate footballers in Poland
Soviet expatriate sportspeople in Poland
FC Volyn Lutsk players
FC Metalist Kharkiv players
Soviet Top League players
Soviet Second League players
Ukrainian Premier League players
Association football defenders
Association football midfielders
Sportspeople from Lviv Oblast